Kerry Joseph Bartlett (born 15 April 1949) is an Australian politician. He was a Liberal member of the Australian House of Representatives between March 1996 and November 2007, representing the Division of Macquarie, New South Wales. He was born in Sydney, New South Wales, and was educated at the University of Sydney and Macquarie University, and has a master's degree in economics from the latter. Before entering politics, he was a school economics and history teacher at Wycliffe Christian School, a university economics tutor and a financial planner.

Bartlett did not attain a ministry but was Chief Government Whip from 2004 until 2007. His seat was radically altered ahead of the 2007 election.  He'd previously held the seat with a fairly safe majority of eight percent, but a redistribution wiped out Bartlett's majority and turned Macquarie into a marginal Labor seat.  He was defeated by former Labor state minister Bob Debus on a swing of six percent.

References

 

1949 births
Living people
Liberal Party of Australia members of the Parliament of Australia
Members of the Australian House of Representatives
Members of the Australian House of Representatives for Macquarie
Macquarie University alumni
University of Sydney alumni
21st-century Australian politicians
20th-century Australian politicians